Wajima-nuri (輪島塗) is a type of Japanese lacquerware from Wajima, Ishikawa. Wajima-nuri represents a form and style of lacquerware which is distinct from other Japanese lacquerware. The main distinguishing feature of Wajima-nuri is the durable undercoating achieved by the applying multiple layers of urushi mixed with powdered diatomaceous earth (ji-no-ko) onto delicate zelkova wooden substrates.

History

Techniques and processes

The Association for the Preservation of Wajima-nuri

See also 

 Ryukyuan lacquerware

References

External links 
 http://shofu.pref.ishikawa.jp/shofu/wajima_e/index2.html

Japanese lacquerware
Japanese art terminology
Wajima, Ishikawa